Stanimir Dimitrov (born 24 April 1972 in Radnevo) is a former Bulgarian footballer.

Career
Dimitrov start to play football in his home town Radnevo in local club Minyor. In 1994, he signed with PFC Naftex Burgas, with whom made his debut in A PFG. Dimitrov earned 264 appearances playing in the top division, scored 38 goals.

In 2005, he signed with FC Tobol, where plays as a central defender. In December 2005, Dimitrov was named the 2005 Foreign Footballer of the Year in Kazakhstan. For Tobol he earned 108 appearances and scored 6 goals.

External links
 

1972 births
Living people
Bulgarian footballers
Neftochimic Burgas players
FC Tobol players
Bulgarian expatriate sportspeople in Kazakhstan
Expatriate footballers in Kazakhstan
First Professional Football League (Bulgaria) players

Association football midfielders
Bulgaria international footballers
People from Radnevo